Light of the World are a British jazz-funk band.

Biography
The band was formed in London in 1978. They were originally a forerunner of the late 1970s/early 1980s British jazz-funk movement. The band's name is taken from the 1974 Kool and the Gang album, Light of Worlds. The original line-up consisted of Jean-Paul Maunick, drummer Everton McCalla, bassist Paul Williams, guitarist Neville McKreith, percussionist Chris Etienne, keyboardist Peter Hinds, trumpet player Kenny Wellington and saxophonist David Baptiste.

The band's debut single "Swingin'", peaked at No. 45 in the UK Singles Chart. This was later followed up by two top 40 hits: a cover of the Bob Marley and the Wailers song "I Shot the Sheriff" (#40), and the double A-side single "I'm So Happy" / "Time" (#35). Their debut album was released in 1979 on Ensign Records. Their second album Round Trip was released in late 1980 and peaked at No. 73 in the UK Albums Chart.

In 1981 Baptiste, Wellington, and McKreith left the group to form Beggar & Co. In 1982, the band released a third album titled Check Us Out. A greatest hits album was issued by Ensign Records in 1985. In 1999 Light of the World briefly reunited and recorded an album titled Inner Voices with Richard Bull as producer and Kenny Wellington as co-producer.

Discography

Studio albums

Compilation album
 The Best of Light of the World (Ensign, 1985)

Singles

References

External links
 

Funk musicians
British funk musical groups
Black British musical groups
Jazz fusion ensembles